Gyacoxung is a township of Samzhubzê District (Shigatse City), in the Tibet Autonomous Region of China. Xigazê railway station is located here.

Administrative divisions
Gyamcoxung Township is divided into 23 villages: 

 Sima Village 
 Zhandui Village
 Jiamudui Village
 Biza Village
 Sangalin Village
 Naolin Village
 Lianzhuo Village
 Qiangdui Village 
 Congxiong Village
 Nujie Village
 Tajie Village
 Dina Village
 Shangqiangjiu Village
 Lian'a Village
 Xiaqiangjiu Village
 Qiongzi Village
 Takang Village
 Kadui Village
 Taba Village
 Gangcun Village
 Xialu Village
 Punu Village
 Puxia Village

References 

Township-level divisions of Tibet
Samzhubzê District